Hermann Alfred Freiherr (Baron) von Gutschmid (1 July 18352 March 1887), German historian and Orientalist, was born at Loschwitz near (Dresden).

He devoted himself to the study of Eastern language and history in its pre-Greek and Hellenistic periods and contributed largely to the literature of the subject. After holding chairs at Kiel (1866), Königsberg (1873), and Jena (1876), he was finally appointed professor of history at Tübingen, where he remained till his death in that city.

Works 

 Über die Fragmente des Pompeius Trogus (supplementary volume of Jahrbücher für classische Philologie, 1857).
 Die makedonische Anagraphe (1864).
 Beiträge zur Geschichte des alten Orients (Leipzig, 1858).
 Neue Beiträge zur Geschichte des alten Orients., vol. i., Die Assyriologie in Deutschland (Leipzig, 1876).
 Die Glaubwürdigkeit der armenischen Geschichte des Moses von Khoren (1877).
 Untersuchungen über die syrische Epitome des eusebischen Canones (1886).
 Untersuchungen über die Geschichte des Königreichs Osraëne (1887).
 Geschichte Irans und seiner Nachbarländer von Alexander dem Großen bis zum Untergang der Arsaciden (History of Iran and its neighboring countries of Alexander the Great to the fall of the Arsacidae); published posthumously by Theodor Nöldeke (1888).

He wrote on Persia and Phoenicia in the 9th edition of the Encyclopædia Britannica. A collection of minor works entitled Kleine Schriften was published by Franz Rühl at Leipzig (1889–1894, 5 vols.), with complete list of his writings. See article by Rühl in Allgemeine deutsche Biographie, xlix. (1904).

See also 
 Victor Gardthausen – one of his students

References

1835 births
1887 deaths
German orientalists
German scholars
People from the Kingdom of Saxony
Academic staff of the University of Jena
Academic staff of the University of Kiel
Academic staff of the University of Königsberg
Academic staff of the University of Tübingen
19th-century German historians
19th-century German writers
19th-century German male writers
German male non-fiction writers